Ratchapol Nawanno (born April 28, 1986), simply known as Na is a Thai professional footballer who plays as a midfielder for Thai League 1 club Nongbua Pitchaya.

International career
In 2013 Ratchapol was called up to the national team by Surachai Jaturapattarapong to the 2015 AFC Asian Cup qualification.
In October, 2013 he debut for Thailand in a friendly match against Bahrain.

International

Honours

Club
Muangthong United
 Thai League Cup (1): 2017
 Thailand Champions Cup (1): 2017
 Mekong Club Championship (1): 2017
PT Prachuap
 Thai League Cup (1): 2019

References

External links

1986 births
Living people
Ratchapol Nawanno
Ratchapol Nawanno
Association football midfielders
Ratchapol Nawanno
Ratchapol Nawanno
Ratchapol Nawanno
Ratchapol Nawanno
Ratchapol Nawanno
Ratchapol Nawanno